The Lacuy Peninsula, alternatively spelled with i, is located in the northwestern corner of Chiloé Island. The peninsula lies a few kilometer west of Ancud but the isthmus that connects to the rest Chiloé Island lies more than 10 km west of Ancud. During colonial times, the peninsula hosted a Spanish fort system consisting of three batteries, one sentinel outpost, and one fort. The fort, named Fuerte de Agüi, was the site of the battle of Agüi in 1820. The geological Lacui Formation is named after the peninsula.

References

Chiloé Archipelago
Peninsulas of Chile